Société de la Propriété Artistique et des Dessins et Modèles, often S.P.A.D.E.M. or SPADEM, was a copyright protection and collection society formed by visual artists and their heirs in France. It is one of several such organizations in France which specialize according to specific kinds of art. Its purpose is similar to that of ASCAP and other organizations which defend the legal rights of artists.

References

1914 establishments in France
Copyright collection societies